Pehli Si Muhabbat is a Pakistani television romantic drama series premiered on 23 January 2021 on ARY Digital and last aired on 9 October 2021 with a total of 37 episodes. The series is produced by Abdullah Seja under banner Idream Entertainment, written by Faiza Iftikhar and stars Maya Ali and Sheheryar Munawar in lead roles along with Hassan Sheheryar Yasin, Rabia Butt, Uzma Hassan, Paras Masroor, Umer Aalam and Hina Afridi in supporting roles.

Plot 

Aslam and Rakshi are childhood friends. They share a great bond with each other and live in neighborhood of Hyderabad. Aslam is sent to stay with his uncle in Karachi for studies while Rakshi remains in Hyderabad. Years passed away and Aslam and Rakshi are now adolescents. Rakshi's father Faiz Ullah marries Nargis, a woman from questionable background and much younger in age than him. Rakshi is somehow nervous and quite sad due to her father's marriage to a much younger woman. Due to Nargis's past and her background, neighbors surround Faiz Ullah's house and order him to leave the neighbourhood. Akram, Aslam's elder brother, instigated by neighbourhood folks, shows his anger and gets furious over this matter. Meanwhile, Aslam goes to rescue Rakshi as neighbors throw stones over her house. In first encounter, Aslam falls for Rakshi that night, remembering in flashback the memories of his childhood encounters with Rakshi and here the love story of both begins.

Cast 

 Maya Ali as Rakshi
 Aina Asif as Rakshi (young)
 Sheheryar Munawar as Aslam
 Hassan Sheheryar Yasin as Akram; Aslam's elder brother
 Nausheen Shah as Ishrat; Akram's wife
 Uzma Hassan as Zainab; Aslam and Akram's sister
 Paras Masroor as Muraad; Zainab's husband
 Saleem Mairaj as Sikander; Zainab's former love interest
 Saba Faisal as Aslam and Akram's mother
 Shabbir Jan as Faiz Ullah; Rakshi's father
 Rabia Butt as Nargis; a tawaif and Faiz Ullah's second wife
 Umer Aalam as Nadeem, Aslam's friend
 Sangeeta as Akram and Aslam's grandmother
 Hina Afridi as Bushra; Aslam's fiance and daughter of his maternal uncle
 Hina Rizvi as Bushra's mother
 Sajid Shah as Bushra's father
 Tariq Jameel as Sikander's father
 Aneesha Altaf as Sadaf; Rakshi's step daughter

Soundtrack

Accolades

References 

2021 Pakistani television series debuts
2021 Pakistani television series endings